Retrofitting is the addition of new technology or features to older systems. Retrofits can happen for a number of reasons, for example with big capital expenditures like naval vessels, military equipment or manufacturing plants, businesses or governments may retrofit in order to reduce the need to replace a system entirely. Other retrofits may be due to changing codes or requirements, such as seismic retrofit which are designed strengthening older buildings in order to make them earthquake-resistant.

Retrofitting is also an important part of climate change mitigation and climate change adaptation: because society invested in built infrastructure, housing and other systems before the magnitude of changes anticipated by climate change. Retrofits to increase building efficiency, for example, both help reduce the overall negative impacts of climate change by reducing building emissions and environmental impacts while also allowing the building to be more healthy during extreme weather events. Retrofitting also is part of a circular economy, reducing the amount of newly manufactured goods, thus reducing lifecycle emissions and environmental impacts.

In different contexts

Building efficiency and greening

Manufacturing 
Principally retrofitting describes the measures taken in the manufacturing industry to allow new or updated parts to be fitted to old or outdated assemblies (like blades to wind turbines).

Retrofitting parts are necessary for manufacture when the design of a large assembly is changed or revised. If, after the changes have been implemented, a customer (with an old version of the product) wishes to purchase a replacement part, then retrofit parts and assembling techniques will have to be used so that the revised parts will fit suitably onto the older assembly.

Retrofitting is an important process used for valves and actuators to ensure optimal operation of an industrial plant. One example is retrofitting a 3-way valve into a 2-way valve, which results in closing one of the three openings to continue using the valve for certain industrial systems. 

Retrofitting can improve a machine or system's overall functionality by using advanced and updated equipment and technology—such as integrating Human Machine Interfaces into older factories.

Benefits of manufacturing retrofits 

Saving on capital expenditure while benefiting from new technologies
 Optimization of existing plant components
 Adaptation of the plant for new or changed products
 Increase in piece number and cycle time
 Guaranteed spare parts availability
 Reduced maintenance costs and increased reliability

Vehicles 

Car customizing is a form of retrofitting, where older vehicles are fitted with new technologies: power windows, cruise control, remote keyless systems, electric fuel pumps, driverless systems, etc.

Trucks and agricultural machines can also be given retrofits to make them driverless.

Military equipment 
Many naval vessels have undergone retrofitting and refitting, sometimes entire classes at once. For instance, the New Threat Upgrade program of the US Navy saw many vessels retrofitted for improved anti-air capability. Naval vessels are often retrofit for one of three reasons: to incorporate new technology, to compensate for performance gaps or weaknesses in design, or to change the ship's classification.

Militaries of the world are often ardent adopters of the latest technology, and many technological advances have been spurred by warfare, especially in fields such as radar and radio communications. Because of this, and the significant investment that a ship hull represents, it is common for retrofitting to be performed whenever new systems are developed. This may be as small as replacing one type of radio with another, or replacing out-dated cryptography equipment with more secure methods of communication, or as major as replacing entire guns and turrets, adding armor plate, or new propulsion systems.

Other ships are retrofit to compensate for weaknesses perceived in their operational capabilities. This was the secondary purpose of the US Navy's New Threat Upgrade program, for instance. Major changes in doctrine or the art of warfare also necessitate changes, such as the anti-aircraft upgrades performed on many World War Two-era vessels as air power became a dominant part of naval strategy and tactics.

Additionally, because of the investment a hull represents, few navies scrap front-line warships. Many times smaller ships are retrofitted for patrol, coast guard, or specialized roles when they are no longer fit for duty as part of a warfleet. The Japanese Momi class from the interwar period, for example, was converted from destroyers to patrol boats in 1939, as they were no longer capable enough to serve in the role of destroyer. Other times classes are retrofit because they are no longer needed in warfare, due to changes in tactics.

Because of the heavy use of retrofitting and refitting, fictional navies also include the concept. As an example, in the Star Trek MMORPG Star Trek Online players can purchase retrofitted ships of famous Star Trek ship classes, such as those crewed by the protagonists of the Star Trek TV series. This is done to allow players to pilot iconic ships from old series of the show, that wouldn't naturally be latest-and-greatest ships due to their obsolescence or size, but are retrofitted to be suitable for a maximum-level player-character admiral.

Environmental management 
The term is also used in the field of environmental engineering, particularly to describe construction or renovation projects on previously built sites, to improve water quality in nearby streams, rivers or lakes. The concept has also been applied to changing the output mix of energy from power plants to cogeneration in urban areas with a potential for district heating.

Sites with extensive impervious surfaces (such as parking lots and rooftops) can generate high levels of stormwater runoff during rainstorms, and this can damage nearby water bodies.  These problems can often be addressed by installing new stormwater management features on the site, a process that practitioners refer to as stormwater retrofitting. Stormwater management practices used in retrofit projects include rain gardens, permeable paving and green roofs. (See also stream restoration.)

See also
 Automotive aftermarket
 Conservation and restoration of road vehicles
 Diesel particulate filter (DPF)
 Electric vehicle conversion
 Green retrofit
 Patch (computing)
 Reindustrialization
 Scrappage program
 Software backporting

References

External links
 Diesel Retrofit in Europe.
 Diesel retrofit glossary
 Diesel Retrofits Help Clean Regions' Air – Maryland Department of Environment
 Diesel Emission Control Strategies Verification – California Air Resources Board

Electric vehicle conversion
Environmental engineering
Production and manufacturing
Vehicle modifications
Water pollution